Sandra Wallenhorst (born 1972) is a professional triathlete from Germany. She competes in World Triathlon Corporation (WTC) Ironman and Ironman 70.3 triathlons.

Sandra's time of 8:47:26 at Ironman Austria 2008 was the fastest women's time in the world in the WTC Ironman 2008 series where 6,223 women finished. (286 Professional + 5,937 Amateurs)

Results

Notes

External links
Official website for Sandra Wallenhorst

German female triathletes
Living people
1972 births
People from Arnstadt
Sportspeople from Thuringia
People from Bezirk Erfurt
Sportspeople from Hanover